CHF may refer to:

Organizations
 Chemical Heritage Foundation, former name of the Science History Institute, an institution that preserves and promotes understanding of the history of science
 Chi Heng Foundation, a Hong Kong-based non-governmental organisation dedicated to addressing children impacted by AIDS
 Chicago Humanities Festival, a foundation which organizes an annual series of lectures, concerts, and films
 Children's Health Fund, a non-profit organization that provides health care to children and families
 Children's Hunger Fund, a Christian non-profit organization that empowers local churches to meet the needs of impoverished community members
 Commando Helicopter Force, a unit of the Royal Navy Fleet Air Arm
 CHF International, former name of Global Communities, an international development and humanitarian aid organization
 Community Health Fund, a Tanzanian health insurance scheme

Science and technology
 Congestive heart failure, a disease when the heart is unable to pump sufficiently to maintain blood flow to meet the body's needs
 Critical heat flux, the thermal limit of a phenomenon in thermodynamics
 Cryptographic hash function, a special class of hash function that has certain properties which make it suitable for use in cryptography
 Central hydraulic fluid, used in automobile power steering
 Chemical formula of hafnium(IV) carbide (CHf)

Other uses
 Centre half-forward, a position in Australian rules football
 Chung Fu stop, a Light Rail stop in Hong Kong
 Swiss franc, by ISO 4217 code, currency of Switzerland and Liechtenstein